Sir Patricius Curwen, 1st Baronet (c. 1602 – 15 December 1664) of Workington Hall, Cumberland was an English landowner and politician who sat in the House of Commons of England  from 1640 to 1643 and from 1661 to 1664. He supported the Royalist side in the English Civil War

Curwen was the son of Sir Henry Curwen of Workington in Cumberland. The Curwen family  owned iron ore mines at Harrington and the account books of Curwen's steward contain many references to iron ore. Curwen was apparently a generous landlord who between 1628 and 1643 paid his harvesters with food and wages and provided a piper to play in the fields for the time of the harvest. In 1627 he was created a baronet, of Workington in the County of Cumberland.

Curwen served as a Justice of the Peace for Cumberland from 1624 to at least 1640 and in 1636 was appointed High Sheriff of Cumberland. In April 1640 he was elected Member of Parliament for Cumberland for the Short Parliament and was re-elected in November 1640 for the Long Parliament. As a staunch Royalist he was one of the 56 MPs who voted to spare the life of the Earl of Strafford and was disabled from sitting in March 1643. When the Civil War started he enlisted as a colonel in the Royalist army. After the Restoration in 1661 Curwen was elected MP for Cumberland again in the Cavalier Parliament and held the seat until his death in 1664.

Curwen died in December 1664 at the age of 62 and was buried at Workington. He had married Lady Isabella Selby, daughter of Sir George Selby of Whitehouse in Durham but their only son Henry had died in 1636. Curwen's Workington estate therefore passed to his brother Thomas and the baronetcy became extinct. In his will he bequeathed money to build and maintain a school at Harrington which was known as the Patricius Curwen School.

References

 

1600s births
1664 deaths
Alumni of Queens' College, Cambridge
English landowners
Royalist military personnel of the English Civil War
Baronets in the Baronetage of England
English MPs 1640 (April)
English MPs 1640–1648
English MPs 1661–1679
High Sheriffs of Cumberland
Patricius